Suhail A. Khan is the Senior Fellow for Muslim-Christian Understanding at the Institute for Global Engagement and Director of External Affairs at Microsoft Corporation. Khan was previously a senior political appointee with the Bush administration, and a conservative political activist in Washington, D.C.

Background and education
Khan was born in Boulder, Colorado, to parents who emigrated to Wyoming and Colorado from southern India. The oldest of five children, Suhail grew up in California, earned his high school diploma from St. Lawrence Academy in Santa Clara in 1987 (a private Catholic college preparatory school), a B.A. in political science from the University of California at Berkeley in 1991 and his J.D. from the University of Iowa in 1995.

Career
Khan served as Policy Director and Press Secretary for U.S. Congressman Tom Campbell (R-CA), working closely on legislation relating to health antitrust reform, religious freedom, the preservation of the Second Amendment, tort reform, gun control, the reform of race-based affirmative action, and the 1998 impeachment proceedings in the House of Representatives. After the 2000 elections, he aided the White House Office of Public Liaison in the President’s outreach to the conservative, think-tank, military and veteran and Asian-American communities.

He served as Assistant to the Secretary for Policy under U.S. Secretary Mary Peters at the U.S. Department of Transportation, where he was awarded the Secretary’s Team Award in 2005 and the Gold Medal for Outstanding Achievement in 2007.

In 2010 and again in 2013, Khan led delegations of American and international faith leaders to Auschwitz, the Nazi death camp that operated in German-occupied Poland and the Dachau concentration camp in Germany, to educate faith and community leaders regarding the tragedy of the Holocaust during World War Two. Joined by Rabbi Jack Bemporad of the Center for Interreligious Understanding of New Jersey  and Professor Marshall Breger of the Catholic University of America Columbus School of Law, the delegations visited the death camps, met with survivors, issued statements strongly condemning anti-Semitism, Holocaust denial, and pledged to fight religious bigotry.

Political activities
In a volunteer capacity, Khan was an active participant in the RNC’s 72-hour program and deployed to key races in states including Colorado, Washington, Iowa, Louisiana, Virginia, New Jersey, Pennsylvania and Massachusetts.

Khan serves on the Board of Directors for the American Conservative Union, the Indian American Conservative Council, and on the interfaith Buxton Initiative Advisory Council. He speaks regularly at conferences and venues such as the Conservative Political Action Conference (CPAC), the Council for National Policy (CNP), the Harbour League, and the National Press Club and has contributed to publications such as the Washington Post/Newsweek Forum On Faith, the Washington Post, Foreign Policy, and Human Events.

Khan was interviewed, by Pastor Bob Roberts of Dallas, Texas, where he discussed Muslim-Christian interaction and his experience serving in the White House, and has appeared on the BBC, CNN, Al-Jazeera, C-SPAN, and MSNBC's The Rachel Maddow Show as a conservative commenter.

Khan has been critical of anti-Muslim sentiments among conservatives and Republicans.

Trump administration 
In 2015, Khan criticized Republican presidential candidate Donald Trump for his anti-Muslim remarks. Khan criticized Islamophobic remarks by Republican candidates Ben Carson and Donald Trump, arguing that they are damaging the efforts of the party to recruit Muslims. After Trump accepted the Republican presidential nomination, Khan stated "I’m not a Trump supporter; I initially supported Rand Paul," and "As a lawyer and conservative, I see that Trump’s comments have had a negative impact on the party." In a 2017 interview, Khan said of the Trump presidency "I'm excited for the nomination and confirmations of Justice Neal Gorsuch and FCC Chairman Ajit Pai". He also anticipated that the Trump administration would work on tax reform for small-business owners and the middle class. Khan was listed as an advisory board member of the "Indian Voices for Trump" coalition for Trump's 2020 re-election campaign.

References

Further reading
 "Helping a Nation Heal" Pat Lopes Harris, San Jose Mercury News, May 5, 2002.
 "Helping a Nation Heal" Pat Lopes Harris, San Jose Mercury News, May 5, 2002.
 "Khan Promoted to Key DOT Post" Aziz Haniffa. India Abroad, October 27, 2006.
 "Khan Promoted to Key DOT Post" Aziz Haniffa. India Abroad, October 27, 2006.

Living people
American Muslims
California Republicans
United States Department of Transportation officials
University of California, Berkeley alumni
University of Iowa alumni
People from Boulder, Colorado
Activists from California
Year of birth missing (living people)